Epsom railway station serves the town of Epsom in Surrey, England. It is located off Waterloo Road and is less than two minutes' walk from the town's high street.

The Oyster Pay as you go was extended to Epsom on 25 February 2019, allowing Oyster cards and contactless cards to be used.

Services
Services at Epsom are operated by Southern and South Western Railway using  and  EMUs.

Until 2022, Class 456 trains were often attached to South Western Railway's Class 455 units to form ten carriage trains, but these were withdrawn on 17 January with the introduction of a new timetable.

The typical off-peak service in trains per hour is:

Southern
 2 tph to  via  
 2 tph to  via 

On Saturday evenings (after approximately 18:45) and on Sundays, there is no service south of Dorking to Horsham.

South Western Railway
 2 tph to  via 
 2 tph to 
 1 tph to 

On Sundays, the service is the same.

On 6 February 2013, Crossrail 2 announced plans to include Epsom in its plans as the most southern terminus of the route. Construction of the line is currently on hold due to lack of available funding.

History

The railway first reached the town in 1847 when an extension of the London, Brighton and South Coast Railway (LBSCR) from West Croydon was opened with a terminus in the former Station Road (now Upper High Street). This station was initially named Epsom,  subsequently renamed Epsom Town.

In 1859 a joint venture between the LBSCR and the London and South Western Railway (LSWR) extended the LSWR from Wimbledon to Epsom, where it joined with the LBSCR, and then ran on to Leatherhead. The lines were connected south of the LBSCR station and a new Epsom station was established on the present site. However competition between the companies remained and the new station was operated by the LSWR only, with the tracks configured so that LBSCR trains ran non-stop on the central tracks.

In 1867 the line was extended south from Leatherhead to Dorking and Horsham, and in 1885 a branch from Leatherhead was built to Effingham Junction, where it connected to the line from Surbiton to Guildford. These extensions provided greater connections for Epsom to much of the rest of Surrey.

After the First World War, the railway companies were merged into the Southern Railway, which set about removing duplication. In 1929 work was completed on building a completely new station on the site of the former LSWR station and the tracks at Epsom were rearranged so that the two island platforms provided cross-platform interchange, although as late as the 1960s there were survivals of different systems of the lines of the two former railway companies in that the semaphore signals on the up platforms to London were upper quadrant (on platform 3) for trains to Victoria and London Bridge, but were lower quadrant (on platform 4) for the Waterloo line.  The former LBSCR station Epsom Town was closed in 1929, (though some of the building remains abandoned and bricked up behind modern developments on Upper High Street, visible from the line from Ewell East). 
When Thameslink services started in 1988 by British Rail its secondary southern route ran to Epsom via Elephant & Castle, West Croydon and Sutton, continuing to Guildford. However the onset of rail privatisation made it difficult to maintain a line running across two other companies' routes and services to Epsom were withdrawn in 1994. One of the proposals for the "Thameslink 2000" project (later renamed Thameslink Programme) is to restore services from this station as part of a massive expansion of that network.

For many years the southern ends of the platforms had a large signal box above them, dating from 1929. It was not listed, and despite extensive roof repairs it was demolished in March 1992.

Formerly there was a siding adjacent to platform 1 with a dock for the reception of race horses travelling by rail horse box.

Derailment Incident: 12 September 2006
Train 2D57, the 19:09 service from London Waterloo to Effingham Junction, became derailed on the approach to Epsom at about 19:42 on Tuesday 12 September 2006. The train was formed of two four-car class 455 electric multiple units (EMUs). The leading bogie of the fourth coach was derailed towards the left as it passed over a set of trailing points on a right-hand curve at about 17 miles per hour (27 km/h). The train came to a stop partially in Epsom station, and passengers were quickly evacuated onto the platform. There were no injuries, and there was only minor damage to the train and the track.
As the train approached Epsom, the driver shut off power and reduced speed to comply
with the  permanent speed restriction round the curve into the station, entering the
curve at 19.2 mph (30.9 km/h). He felt a judder, and looked back, observing blue flashes
and smoke from the rear of the train. He assumed there was a fault with the train, and
attempted to coast into the station. As the fourth coach came into his field of vision, the
driver saw that it was derailed and made an emergency brake application. The train then
stopped within five seconds.
In the report by the Rail Accident Investigation Branch into the accident, the maintenance of track and points was heavily criticised. The removal of a remote rail lubricator by Network Rail was also criticised.

Redevelopment

The main ticket office and station frontage have been completely demolished and rebuilt. The redevelopment includes a new, larger ticket office, new shop units (Tesco and Costa Coffee), flats and a new Travelodge hotel. Redevelopment started in November 2010 and was expected to be completed by June 2012, but was delayed and completed in 2013. During the redevelopment the station remained open, with a temporary ticket office on the forecourt. In addition to redevelopment of the ticket hall there will be full refurbishment of the platform buildings and canopies.

References

External links

Route Map and Timetable for Sutton & Mole Valley Line

Metrobus services from Epsom Station
Falcon Bus service from Epsom Station

Railway stations in Surrey
Former London and South Western Railway stations
Railway stations in Great Britain opened in 1859
Railway stations served by Govia Thameslink Railway
Railway stations served by South Western Railway
Transport in Epsom and Ewell
Epsom
1859 establishments in England
DfT Category C1 stations